The 1958 Detroit Titans football team represented the University of Detroit as an independent during the 1958 NCAA University Division football season. In their fifth and final year under head coach Wally Fromhart, the Titans compiled a 4–4–1 record and were outscored by a combined total of 157 to 131.

The team's statistical leaders included Lou Faoro with 584 passing yards and Bruce Maher with 576 rushing yards, 295 receiving yards, and 42 points scored.

Schedule

References

External links
 1958 University of Detroit football programs

Detroit
Detroit Titans football seasons
Detroit Titans football
Detroit Titans football